Kieron Dawson (born 29 January 1975 in Bangor, County Down, Northern Ireland) is a retired Irish rugby union player who was a flanker for Ulster and Ireland.

He played for Bangor prior to his move to London Irish in 1996, he played 190 games in his 10 years at the Exiles. He was London Irish player of the season in 2000-01 and helped the club win the Powergen Cup in 2002.

He was capped at Ireland A, under-21, students and schoolboy levels and went on to win 21 Ireland caps and was part the 1999 Rugby World Cup squad. He also played for the Barbarians in the 2003-04 season.

In July 2011, Dawson was appointed head coach of Worthing Rugby Football Club.

References

External links
Ulster profile

Irish rugby union players
Ireland international rugby union players
Ulster Rugby players
London Irish players
Barbarian F.C. players
Rugby union flankers
1975 births
Living people
People from Bangor, County Down
People educated at Bangor Grammar School
Ireland international rugby sevens players
Rugby union players from County Down